The Theban Tomb TT13 is located in Dra' Abu el-Naga', part of the Theban Necropolis, on the west bank of the Nile, opposite to Luxor. It is the burial place of the ancient Egyptian Shuroy, who was Head of Brazier-bearers of Amun.

See also
 List of Theban tombs
 N. de Garis Davies, Nina and Norman de Garis Davies, Egyptologists

References

External links
Scans of Norman and Nina De Garis Davies' tracings of Theban Tomb 13 (external).

Theban tombs